WASP-96 is a G8-type star, located approximately 1150 light-years from Earth in the constellation of Phoenix.

It is known to host at least one exoplanet, WASP-96b. It was discovered in 2013 by the Wide Angle Search for Planets (WASP), utilising the transit method.
In July 2022, NASA announced that a spectrum of the planet would be featured in the initial science release from the James Webb Space Telescope.

Planetary system
Observations from the James Webb Space Telescope show that WASP-96b displays a distinct signature of water, along with evidence for clouds and haze in its spectrum, in contrast to what was previously believed to  be an entirely cloudless atmosphere.

See also 
 List of stars in Phoenix

References 

Wide Angle Search for Planets
G-type main-sequence stars
Phoenix (constellation)
Planetary systems with one confirmed planet
J00041112–4721382
TIC objects